Allen Dizon (born on October 3, 1977), is a Filipino actor, model and producer in the Philippines. A former member of the Viva Hot Men, Dizon has transitioned from his early years in daring roles to become an independent film actor and producer.

In 2007, he won the Best Supporting Actor FAMAS award and Star Award for Movies in the film Twilight Dancers. Dizon appeared in movies such as Dukot (2009), Sigwa (2010), Patikul (2011), Deadline (2011), and Migrante (2012). He played as Sonny Burgos in the film Burgos (2013) starring Lorna Tolentino and Rocco Nacino, directed by Joel Lamangan. Dizon played as a soldier in Lauriana (2013) with Bangs Garcia and Rich Asuncion. He starred in ABS-CBN's melodrama series Doble Kara (2015), as Antonio Dela Rosa.

Dizon produced the indie films Crossroads (Paupahan) (2008), Marino (2009) and Dukot (2009).

Awards and nominations

International Film Festivals

 Note: The Special Jury Prize in the 33rd Warsaw International Film Festival was co-awarded to Angeli Nicole Sanoy.

Local Film Festivals

"The First Four" Major Award-Giving Bodies
 Pertaining to: Filipino Academy of Movie Arts and Sciences (FAMAS) Awards, Manunuri ng Pelikulang Pilipino (MPP) Gawad Urian, Film Academy of the Philippines (FAP) Luna Awards and Philippine Movie Press Club (PMPC) Star Awards for Movies; collectively accepted to comprise, when all won in a single year, the "Grand Slam" achievement in the Philippines.

Other Major Award-Giving Bodies
 Pertaining to: the Young Critics Circle Film Desk (YCC), the defunct Entertainment Press Society, Inc. (EnPress) and the more recent Society of Philippine Entertainment Editors, Inc. (SPEEd).

Note: The 24th YCC Annual Citations for the films of 2013 were actually announced April 2015, along with the 25th Annual Citations for films of 2014.

Academe-Based & Regional-Based Award-Giving Bodies
 Pertaining to: Pampelikulang Samahan ng mga Dalubguro (Gawad Pasado), Tagapuring mga Akademik ng Aninong Gumagalaw (Gawad Tanglaw), Critics Academy Film Desk of Zamboanga City (Gawad Genio), Urduja Film Festival Social Advocacy from Pangasinan (Urduja Heritage Film Awards), Guild of Educators, Mentors and Students (GEMS Hiyas ng Sining Awards) and 3Stars Productions (Laguna Excellence Awards).

Award-Giving Bodies Recognizing Achievements for Television
 Pertaining to: Philippine Movie Press Club (PMPC) Star Awards for TV, Kapisanan ng mga Brodkaster sa Pilipinas (KBP) Golden Dove Awards, Tagapuring mga Akademik ng Aninong Gumagalaw (Gawad Tanglaw) and Guild of Educators, Mentors and Students (GEMS Hiyas ng Sining Awards).

Special Awards

Note: FDCP's Artistic Excellence Award handed out during its Annual Film Ambassadors' Night is also now termed as Camera Obscura Award.

Filmography

Film

Ligalig (post-production)
Pamilya Sa Dilim (post-production)
Oras De Peligro (2023)
Abe-Nida (2023)
Walker (2023)
An Affair To Forget (2022)
Latay (2020)
Mindanao (2019)
Jesusa (2019) 
Alpha: The Right To Kill (2018)
Persons of Interest (2018)
Bomba (2017)
Malinak Ya Labi (2016)
Area (2016)
Lando at Bugoy (2016)
Iadya Mo Kami (2016)
Sekyu (2016)
Imbisibol (2015)
Magkakabaung (2014)
Kamkam (2014)
Children's Show (2014)
Burgos (2013)
Lauriana (2013)
El Presidente (2012)
Flames Of Love (2012)
Migrante (2012)
Deadline: The Reign Of Impunity (2011)
Patikul (2011)
Pink Halo-Halo (2010)
Sigwa (2010)
Dukot (2009)
Marino (2009)
Tutok (2009)
Loophole (2009)
Baler (2008)
Room 213 (2008)
Crossroads (2008)
Ikaw Pa Rin: Bongga Ka Boy! (2008)
Twilight Dancers (2006)
Boso (2005)
Erotica: Lessons Of The Flesh (Video) (2005)
Hotmen (Video) (2004)
Langit Mo Kaligayahan Ko (2004)
Tumitibok, Kumikirot (2003)
Xerex (2003)
Boldstar (2003)
Motel (2003)
Balat-Sibuyas (2003)
Kiskisan (2003)
Matamis Hanggang Dulo (2003)
Tukaan (2002)
Sugat, Walang Paghilom (2002)
Mama San (2002)
Sana Totoo Na (2002)
Eva, Lason Kay Adan (2002)
Hinog Sa Pilit, Sobra Sa Tamis (2002)
Kaulayaw (2002)
Virgin People III (2002)
Hayup Sa Sex Appeal (2001)
Trip (2001)
Venus: Dyosa Ng Kagandahan (2001)
Amorseko: Damong Ligaw (2001)
Oras Na Para Lumaban (2001)
Ika-Pitong Gloria (2001)
Malikot Ang Agos Ng Tubig (2001)
Ang Gusto Ko Sa Lalaki (2000)
Bukas May Ligaya (2000)
Saranggani (2000)
Azucena (2000)
Gawin Sa Dilim 2 (2000)
Terror (1999)
Luksong Tinik (1999)
Pila Balde (1999)
Pamasak Butas (1999)
Hilig Ng Katawan (1999)
Nikilado (1999)
Huwag Po, Huwag Po (1999)
Molata (1999)
Tatlong Makasalanan (1999)
Shirley (1998)
Babae Sa Bubungang Lata (1998)
Curacha: Ang Babaeng Walang Pahinga (1998)
Private Parts
Hipo

Television

Abot-Kamay na Pangarap (2023) GMA Network
Wish Ko Lang - Dalagita Sa Kakahuyan (2023) GMA Network
Wish Ko Lang - Palo (2023) GMA Network
Return to Paradise (TV series) (2022) GMA Network
Tadhana - Hanggang Kailan (2022) GMA Network
Magpakailanman - My Kidney Belongs To You (2022) GMA Network
Wish Ko Lang - Boso (2022) GMA Network
The World Between Us  (TV series) (2021-2022) GMA Network
Agimat ng Agila (TV series) (2021-2022) GMA Network
First Yaya (TV series) (2021) GMA Network
Wish Ko Lang - Nalunod (2020) GMA Network
Ipaglaban Mo - Tiyuhin (2020) ABS-CBN
Magpakailanman - Kailan Naging Ama Ang Isang Babae (2019) GMA Network
Ipaglaban Mo - Utang (2019) ABS-CBN
Maalaala Mo Kaya - Palay (2019) ABS-CBN
Toda One I Love (2019) GMA Network
Brillante Mendoza's Amo (2018) TV5
Maalaala Mo Kaya - Duyan (2018) ABS-CBN
Princess in the Palace (TV series) (2016) GMA Network
Doble Kara (TV series) (2015-2017) ABS-CBN
Ipaglaban Mo - Hanggang Sa Huli (2015) ABS-CBN
Ipaglaban Mo - Amin Ang Pamana Mo (2014) ABS-CBN
Maalaala Mo Kaya - Drawing (2013) ABS-CBN
Princess and I (TV series) (2012-2013) ABS-CBN
Nasaan Ka Elisa? (TV series) (2011-2012) ABS-CBN
Maalaala Mo Kaya - Funeral Parlor (2010) ABS-CBN
5 Star Specials (2010)  TV5
Kung Fu Kids (TV series) (2008) ABS-CBN
Pinakamamahal (TV series) (2006) GMA Network
Mga Anghel na Walang Langit (TV series) (2005-2006) ABS-CBN
''Saan Ka Man Naroroon '(TV series) (1999) ABS-CBN

References

External links
 

Living people
Filipino male film actors
Filipino male television actors
People from Misamis Occidental
1977 births
GMA Network personalities
ABS-CBN personalities